Gavin Hickie is the Head Coach and Director of Rugby for the United States Naval Academy. Gavin is a professional rugby coach, an author and podcaster, with his own show, Rugby Revealed Rugby Revealed.

Hickie was the head coach of the Dartmouth College rugby team 2012 to 2017, following the departure of former Dartmouth head coach Alex Magleby to coach the US national rugby sevens team. Formerly, Hickie was the forwards coach of Belmont Shore Rugby Club, and the head coach of Wilson High School, Long Beach, California. He has previously coached USA U20s to the Junior World Trophy title in 2012 and the USA U20s in the Junior World Championship 2013, before going on to be the head coach of the Collegiate All-Americans from 2015-2017. Hickie also coached USA in the Americas Rugby Championship in 2012 along with Leicester Tigers Academy and St. Mary's College Rugby Club.

Hickie is also a rugby analyst and writer, contributing frequently to rugby websites, newspapers, magazines, podcasts and radio shows, including an appearance on CNN, the Stu, Tiffany & Jimbo Show on KCAL-FM.  He writes for RugbyToday, The Rugby Site and his own website, Rugby Revealed.

In September 2015 Hickie became an author, when Bloomsbury Publishing published his book Rugby Revealed. Written with co-author Eilidh Donaldson, Rugby Revealed features advice from over 100 top players and coaches in the professional game. Rugby Revealed is currently one of the best-selling rugby books on Amazon.com.

A portion of the proceeds of the sale of Rugby Revealed goes to the Barbarians Rugby Charitable Trust.

Playing career 
Hickie was educated in St Marys College and University College Dublin and went on to play for Ireland Schools, U19, U21, A Level and 7's. He made his debut for Ireland A in the 70th minute of 55–22 victory over Wales A on 2 February 2002.

Hickie played as a hooker and played professional rugby for Leinster, helping Leinster win the inaugural Celtic League in 2001. Hickie also played with the London Irish RFC and Worcester Warriors. Hickie played with the Leicester Tigers helping the team win the Guinness Premiership in 2007. His career ended after a tackle on Jason Robinson resulted in an injury to his infraspinatus and supraspinatus muscles which effectively ended his playing career.

Hickie captained Ireland 7's and represented Leicester Tigers and St. Mary's College in 7's rugby.

Hickie also played rugby in the United States with Belmont Shore RFC in the Rugby Super League (US).

Personal
Gavin is first cousin to former professional rugby player Denis Hickie and son of former Irish international rugby player Denis J. Hickie.

References

External links 
Leicester Tigers profile
http://www.lineoutcoach.com

1980 births
Living people
Irish rugby union coaches
Irish rugby union players
Leicester Tigers players
Ireland international rugby sevens players
Leinster Rugby players
London Irish players
Worcester Warriors players
Alumni of University College Dublin
Irish expatriate sportspeople in England
Irish expatriate sportspeople in the United States
Irish expatriate rugby union players
Rugby union players from Dublin (city)
Expatriate rugby union players in England
Expatriate rugby union players in the United States
Dartmouth Big Green coaches‎